Christopher Russell Gartin (born January 12, 1978, in New York City, New York) is an American actor and producer, known for Black Swan (2010), Tremors 2: Aftershocks (1996) and Transcendence (2014). He was previously married to Joanne Ahlfield.

Filmography

References

External links
"Space Babies" 2014 Kia Sorento Big Game Ad, Youtube, January 29, 2013

1968 births
Living people
American male film actors
American male television actors
Male actors from New York City